This is a list of notable rice drinks. This list contains fermented and unfermented drinks made from rice.

Rice drinks

 Andong soju
 Awamori
 Apo (drink)
 Black vinegar
 Genmaicha
 Handia (drink)
 Horchata
 Huangjiu
 Hyeonmi cha
 Jūrokucha
 Kokkoh
 Mijiu
 Rice baijiu
 Rice milk
 Rice water
 Sikhye
 Soju

Rice wine

Rice wine is an alcoholic drink made from rice.
 Apo (drink) 
 Ara (drink) 
 Beopju 
 Brem 
 Cheongju (wine) 
 Chhaang 
 Choujiu 
 Chuak
 Cơm rượu 
 Gamju 
 Gekkeikan 
 Jiuniang 
 Kanghaju 
 Makgeolli 
 Mirin 
 Pinjopo 
 Raksi 
 Rượu cần 
 Rượu đế 
 Rượu nếp 
 Sato (rice wine) 
 Shoutoku 
 Snake wine 
 Sonti (beverage) 
 Tapuy 
 Toso 
 Tuak 
 Zutho

Sake

Sake is an alcoholic drink of Japanese origin that is made from fermented rice.
 Amazake 
 Nigori 
 Shoutoku 
Sawanotsuru
Gekkeikan
Sudo Honke
 TY KU

Cocktails with sake
 Ginza Mary
 Sake bomb
 Saketini
 Tamagozake

See also
 Korean alcoholic beverages
Chinese alcoholic beverages
Du Kang
 Sake set 
Aspergillus oryzae
Amylolytic process
Sake kasu

References

 
Lists of drinks